
miR-144 is a family of microRNA precursors found in mammals, including humans. The ~22 nucleotide mature miRNA sequence is excised from the precursor hairpin by the enzyme Dicer. In humans, miR-144 has been characterised as a "common miRNA signature" of a number of different tumours.

GATA4 is thought to activate transcription of the miR-144 microRNA precursor.

Function 

miR-144 functions in a cluster with miR-451. This locus regulates the expression of a number of genes whose products are involved in erythropoiesis. One of the identified targets of miR-144 is insulin receptor substrate 1.

Applications 

miR-144 has been identified as one of a number of potential miRNA targets which could be used to treat schizophrenia and bipolar affective disorder. It has also been suggested as a potential therapeutic tool to treat ischemic heart disease.

References

Further reading

External links 
 

MicroRNA